South Korea, as Korea, competed at the 1968 Summer Olympics in Mexico City, Mexico. 54 competitors, 41 men and 13 women, took part in 43 events in 11 sports.

Medalists

Athletics

Basketball

Boxing

Cycling

Two cyclists represented South Korea in 1968.

Individual road race
 Gwon Jung-hyeon

Sprint
 Kim Gwang-seon
 Gwon Jung-hyeon

1000m time trial
 Kim Gwang-seon

Individual pursuit
 Gwon Jung-hyeon

Diving

Gymnastics

Shooting

Two shooters, both men, represented South Korea in 1968.
Open

Swimming

Volleyball

Women's Team Competition
 Round Robin
 Lost to Poland (2-3)
 Lost to Peru (0-3)
 Lost to Soviet Union (0-3)
 Defeated United States (3-1)
 Defeated Mexico (3-0)
 Lost to Japan (0-3)
 Defeated Czechoslovakia (3-1) → Fifth place

Team Roster

Weightlifting

Wrestling

References

External links
 Official Olympic Reports
 International Olympic Committee results database

Korea, South
1968
1968 in South Korean sport